Gärd Kristin "Kicki" Bengtsson (born 12 January 1970) is a Swedish former footballer who played as a defender. She represented the Sweden national team from 1991 to 2005.

Career
She holds 157 caps for the Swedish women's national team. Bengtsson has appeared in three World Cups, 1995, 1999, and 2003 competitions. She netted one goal in the 1999 competition, scoring the opening goal on her team's first day of match play against China. She competed at three Olympic Games with Sweden: Atlanta 1996, Sydney 2000, and Athens 2004. Bengtsson also appeared in four UEFA Championships with Sweden, 1995, 1997, 2001, and 2005 competitions.

Matches and goals scored at World Cup tournaments

Matches and goals scored at European Championship tournaments

Honours

Club 

 Djurgårdens IF
 Damallsvenskan: winner 2004
Svenska Cupen: Winner 2004, 2005

Hammarby IF
Svenska Cupen: Winner 1994, 1995

International
Sweden
1995 FIFA Women's World Cup: Quarter-final
1999 FIFA Women's World Cup: Quarter-final
2003 FIFA Women's World Cup: Runner-up  
1996 Summer Olympics in Atlanta: Group stage
2000 Summer Olympics in Sydney: Group stage
2004 Summer Olympics in Athens: Fourth place
UEFA Women's Euro 1995: Runner-up 
UEFA Women's Euro 1997: Semi-finals
UEFA Women's Euro 2001: Runner-up 
UEFA Women's Euro 2005: Semi-finals
Algarve Cup (Participated from 1994 to 2005): Winner 1995, 2001
Four Nations Tournament: Fourth Place 1998, Third Place 2004
Australia Cup: Winner 2003

Individual

 Diamantbollen: (2): 1994, 2004
 Swedish Defender of the Year (1): 2004

Footnotes

References

Match reports

External links

1970 births
Living people
Swedish women's footballers
Olympic footballers of Sweden
Footballers at the 1996 Summer Olympics
Footballers at the 2000 Summer Olympics
Footballers at the 2004 Summer Olympics
Footballers from Stockholm
Sweden women's international footballers
1995 FIFA Women's World Cup players
FIFA Century Club
Women's United Soccer Association players
San Diego Spirit players
Hammarby Fotboll (women) players
Damallsvenskan players
BK Häcken FF players
FC Rosengård players
Djurgårdens IF Fotboll (women) players
Carolina Courage players
1999 FIFA Women's World Cup players
2003 FIFA Women's World Cup players
Athene Moss players
Toppserien players
Swedish expatriate footballers
Expatriate women's footballers in Norway
Expatriate women's soccer players in the United States
Swedish expatriate sportspeople in the United States
Swedish expatriate sportspeople in Japan
Swedish expatriate sportspeople in Norway
Suzuyo Shimizu FC Lovely Ladies players
Nadeshiko League players
Expatriate women's footballers in Japan
Women's association football defenders
Öxabäcks IF players